Kevin López Yerga (born 12 June 1990) is a Spanish middle distance runner. He was born in Lora del Río.

Competition record

References
 

1990 births
Living people
Spanish male middle-distance runners
People from Vega del Guadalquivir
Sportspeople from the Province of Seville
Olympic athletes of Spain
Athletes (track and field) at the 2012 Summer Olympics
Athletes (track and field) at the 2016 Summer Olympics
World Athletics Championships athletes for Spain
Spanish Athletics Championships winners
21st-century Spanish people